Maturango Museum is located in Ridgecrest, California. The museum is best known for the guided tours of the Coso Rock Art District located on China Lake Naval Weapons Station. The museum offers exhibits and displays featuring both the natural and the cultural history and diversity of the Northern Mojave Desert with exhibits of animals, plants, rocks and minerals, Native American artifacts, and contemporary arts and crafts.

About
This small museum was founded in 1962 and originally designed to highlight the history of Ridgecrest and nearby China Lake. The museum was named after the highest peak in the close by Argus Range.

The town of Ridgecrest, where the museum is located, is surrounded by four mountain ranges: the Sierra Nevada on the west, the Cosos on the north, the Argus Range on the east, and the El Paso Mountains on the south.

Since 2014, Debbie Benson has served as director of the museum.

See also 
 List of museums in California
 Historic landmarks in California
List of nature centers in California
National Register of Historic Places listings in Kern County, California
 Ridgecrest Petroglyph Festival

References

External links 
Maturango Museum Home Page
Maturango Museum (DesertUSA)
Historical Society of the Upper Mojave Desert
Ridgecrest Desert Wildflower Festival

Museums in Kern County, California
History museums in California
Natural history museums in California
Native American museums in California
Mojave Desert
Ridgecrest, California
Paleontology in California
History of Kern County, California
Natural history of the Mojave Desert
Museums established in 1962
1962 establishments in California